Lakhir is a rural locality (a selo) in Khuninsky Selsoviet, Laksky District, Republic of Dagestan, Russia. The population was 44 as of 2010.

Geography 
Lakhir is located 12 km east of Kumukh (the district's administrative centre) by road. Turtsi and Khuna are the nearest rural localities.

Nationalities 
Laks live there.

References 

Rural localities in Laksky District